The Web Rule Language (WRL) is a rule-based ontology language for the Semantic Web. The language is characterized by formal semantics.

See also
 OWL
 RDF
 XML

External links
 Web Rule Language (WRL) - W3C Member Submission 09 September 2005

Semantic Web